Namseoul University is a private university located in Cheonan, South Korea. The institution was initially founded as the Southern Seoul Industrial University in 1994 and renamed to Namseoul University in 1998.

History 

Namseoul University began accepting students in 1994.  Dr. Ho Keun Kim became its first vice-chancellor.

The university opened with nine departments: Computer Science, Electrical Engineering, Information and Technology, Communication Studies, Industrial Design, Business Management, Marketing, English and Japanese.

The university expanded its educational offerings over the following eight years by adding seven academic departments. The first graduation ceremony was held on February 20, 1998. In 2007, the university opened the Graduate School of Child Behavior Therapy.

In 2008, the university opened an International Exchanges and Cooperation Center (IECC) in India. 2008 also saw the introduction of the university's Architectural Engineering, Nursing Science, Geriatric Welfare, and Clinical Pathology programs.

In 2016 the university began offering master's degrees taught in English by English speaking professors. Originally this was offered under the umbrella of the Korean Graduate School's Global Education Institute. However, by 2017 the program had grown substantially and Namseoul University formed a separate graduate school. It is now known as the Namseoul University International Graduate School.

Undergraduate Courses 

Liberal Arts and Government

Engineering 

 Electronic engineering
 Computer science
 Information and communications
 Architecture
 Architectural engineering
 Multimedia 
 Industrial engineering
 Geographic information science

Art & Physical Education 

 Visual information design
 Environment molding
 Motion Arts Design
 Sports business administration
 Exercise health

Business & Public Administration 
 International distribution
 International trade
 Business administration
 Advertising and public relations
 Hotel management
 Tourism management
 Tax in korean
 Real estate

Humanities & Social Studies 
 English
 Japanese
 Chinese
 Child welfare
 Social welfare
 Elderly welfare

Health & Health Care 
 Health administration
 Dental hygiene 
 Physical therapy
 Nursing
 Clinical pathology
 Emergency medical technology

Postgraduate Departments

Campus 

 Gong Hak 1Kan (Building No. 1)
 Gong Hak 2Kan (Building No. 2)
 Sang Kyung HakKan (Building No. 3)
 Student Hall Annex (Building No. 4)
 Tue Articles of Incorporation ( Building No. 5)
 Formative Gakkan (Building No. 7)
 Students Welfare Hall (Building No. 8)
 Carcinoma Memorial Central Library (Building No. 9)
 Humanities and Social Gakkan (Building No. 10)
 Aelrim dormitory (Building No. 11)

Notable people
Joo Sang-wook, actor
Park Hae-il, actor

References

External links 
 Official website   
 Namseoul University International Graduate School (In English)

Private universities and colleges in South Korea
Animation schools in South Korea
1994 establishments in South Korea
Educational institutions established in 1994